"Gine Mazi Mou Paidi" is a song written by Thanos Papanikolaou in 2006 specifically to raise money for a fundraiser οrganized by ANT1 TV. Many popular presenters, actors, singers and others from the radio station "Rythmos 94.9" participated to the fundraiser to help raise money for the poor and disabled children all over the Greece.

Track listing

Participants

First Song

Kalomira
Kostas Karafotis
Giorgos Lianos
Maro Lytra
Mary Akrivopoulou
Grigoris Valtinos
Markella Giannatou
Kostas Kolkas
Renia Louizidou
Evdokia Roumelioti
Haris Romas
Niki Kartsona
Eleonora Meleti
Makis Pounentis

Second Song
Chorus of Spiros Lampros

References

2006 singles
Greek-language songs
Kalomira songs